Hong Kong is an autonomous territory of the People's Republic of China on the Pearl River Delta of East Asia. Hong Kong is one of the world's most significant financial centres, with the highest Financial Development Index score and consistently ranks as the world's most competitive and freest economic entity. As world's 8th largest trading entity, its legal tender, the Hong Kong dollar, is the world's 13th most traded currency. Hong Kong's tertiary sector dominated economy is characterised by simple taxation with a competitive level of corporate tax and supported by its independent judiciary system. However, while Hong Kong has one of the highest per capita incomes in the world, it suffers from severe income inequality.

For further information on the types of business entities in this country and their abbreviations, see "Business entities in Hong Kong".

Notable firms 
This list includes notable companies with primary headquarters located in the city. The industry and sector follow the Industry Classification Benchmark taxonomy. Organizations which have ceased operations are included and noted as defunct.

See also 
 Hong Kong Stock Exchange
 List of airlines of Hong Kong
 List of banks in Hong Kong
 List of companies listed on the Hong Kong Stock Exchange
 List of newspapers in Hong Kong

References